Scyllarus is a genus of slipper lobsters from the Atlantic Ocean, including the Mediterranean and Caribbean. Until 2002, the genus included far more species, but these are now placed in other genera. The following species remain in Scyllarus:

Scyllarus americanus (Smith, 1869)
Scyllarus arctus (Linnaeus, 1758)
Scyllarus caparti Holthuis, 1952
Scyllarus chacei Holthuis, 1960
Scyllarus depressus (Smith, 1881)
Scyllarus paradoxus Miers, 1881
Scyllarus planorbis Holthuis, 1969
Scyllarus pygmaeus (Bate, 1888)
Scyllarus subarctus Crosnier, 1970

References

Achelata